The Panssarimiina m/39 is a Finnish anti-tank blast mine used during the Winter War, Second World War and Continuation War. The mine superseded the Panssarimiina m/36 in service with the Finnish Army. It was first delivered in December 1939 while the Winter War was taking place. Though it was simpler to produce than the earlier m/36 it was still too complicated, and supply was outstripped by demand. This spawned the rapid design and development of the wooden Panssarimiina m/S-39 which could be largely produced without the use of metal working machinery.

The mine proved to have too little explosive content to reliably break the tracks of the latest Russian tanks, so a supplemental charges were issued, consisting of 2.5 kg of TNT in a metal box, they could be buried under the mine to supplement the main charge. Where these supplemental charges were not available a second mine was buried under the first.

Specifications
 Height: 0.12 m
 Diameter: 0.227 m
 Weight: 7 kg
 Explosive content: 3.2 kg of TNT or Amatol
 Operating pressure: 280 to 200 kg

External links
 Finnish anti-tank mines at Jaegerplatoon.net

Finnish anti-tank mines
World War II military equipment of Finland